Eresina conradti is a butterfly in the family Lycaenidae. It is found in Cameroon, Uganda and north-western Tanzania. Its habitat consists of dense, primary forests.

References

Butterflies described in 1956
Poritiinae